Supernumerary phantom limb is a condition where the affected individual believes and receives sensory information from limbs of the body that do not actually exist, and never have existed, in contradistinction to phantom limbs, which appear after an individual has had a limb removed from the body and still receives input from it.

An fMRI study of a subject with a supernumerary phantom left arm was done by Khateb et al. at the Laboratory of Experimental Neuropsychology at the University of Geneva.  When the subject was told to touch her right cheek with the phantom limb, there was increased activity in the motor cortex of her brain in the area roughly corresponding to the left arm.  When she announced that she had touched the phantom limb to her cheek, activity was monitored in the area of the somatosensory cortex that corresponded to the right cheek.  At times during the experiment, the subject was asked to move the phantom limb to a location that was obstructed or otherwise unfeasible.  In these instances, there was similar activation of the motor cortex but no such activity in the somatosensory cortex.

Affected areas of the brain
 Motor cortex
 Somatosensory cortex
 Tactile (touch) controlling areas

See also
Body integrity identity disorder (BIID)
Supernumerary body part – having an extra limb

References

McGeoch, P.D. et al. (2009). Apotemnophilia – the neurological basis of a ‘psychological’ disorder. Nature Precedings DOI: 10101/npre.2009.2954.1.

Neurological disorders
Supernumerary body parts
Syndromes
Amputations